Sebastes rastrelliger, the grass rockfish,   is a species of marine ray-finned fish belonging to the subfamily Sebastinae, the rockfishes, part of the family Scorpaenidae. It is native to the waters of the eastern Pacific Ocean.

Taxonomy
Sebastes rastrelliger was first formally described as Sebastichthys rastrelliger in 1880 by the American ichthyologists David Starr Jordan and Charles Henry Gilbert with the type locality given as Point Conception to Santa Catalina Island in California. Some authorities place this species in the subgenus Pteropodus. The specific name rastrelliger is a compound of rastrella, a diminutive of rastrum which means "rake" with iger meaning "to bear", a  reference to the short gill rakers as described by Jordan and Gilbert.

Description
Sebastes rastrelliger has a body which has a depth of around one third of its standard length with a broad head which has a tapering snout. The dorsal fin has 13 spines and 12 to 14 soft rays while the anal fin has 3 spines and 6 soft rays. The caudal fin is broad and rounded and the caudal peduncle is wide. The overall colour of this species is dark green fading to whitish on the ventral part of the body,

Distribution and habitat
Sebastes ratrelliger is found in the eastern Pacific Ocean along the western coast of North America. It ranges from Cedros Island in Baja California north as far as Ucluelet on Vancouver Island in British Columbia, although they are most abundant from northern California south. This is a shallow water species in which the juveniles and adults occur on hard structures, such as reefs, and among kelp beds where there are crevices they can use as shelters.

Biology
Sebastes rastreliger is a predatory species feeding on crustaceans and smaller fishes such as juvenile surfperches and midshipmen (Porichthys spp). They have been found to live up to 23 years with the males and females growing at roughly the same rate and have similar maximum sizes. The females bear between 80,000 and 760,000 eggs in a season and the larvae are all released simultaneously. In southerbn California breeding occurs between January and March with peaking in January. The larvae do not disperse far and the adults aree sedentary, remaining within their home range for most of their life,

Fisheries
Sebastes rastrelliger is an important species in commercial and recreational fisheries.

References

External links
 
 

rastrelliger
Taxa named by David Starr Jordan
Taxa named by Charles Henry Gilbert
Fish described in 1880